Ameriflight LLC is an American cargo airline with headquarters at the Dallas/Fort Worth International Airport. It is the largest United States FAA Part 135 cargo carrier, operating scheduled and contract cargo services from 19 bases to destinations in 250 cities across 43 US states as well as in Canada, Mexico, the Caribbean, and South America. Ameriflight serves major financial institutions, freight forwarders, laboratories, and overnight couriers in the US, and provides feeder services for overnight express carriers nationwide and internationally. Ameriflight averages 525 daily departures with over 100,000 combined flight hours annually and a 99.5% on-time performance. Ameriflight employs over 700 people (225 pilots, 140 mechanics).

History
Ameriflight was established in 1968 as California Air Charter. The company's first route, CalAir 103, was bank mail and cancelled checks flown in a Piper Cherokee Six (PA-32) from Hollywood-Burbank Airport to Riverside Municipal Airport, and then on to Blythe Airport near the Colorado River.

The company merged with United Couriers, a wholly owned subsidiary of ATI Systems International (ATIS), in 1971. In April 1993, the fixed-wing division of Wings Express (which was based at Van Nuys Airport) was purchased, and the outstanding shares of Sports Air Travel were acquired in mid-1997. In March 2007, when Canadian company Garda Security bought ATIS, Ameriflight was sold to a group of investors that included the company's president, Gary Richards.

In May 2014, the airline announced it was moving its headquarters to Dallas-Fort Worth International Airport (DFW). Maintenance operations and flight operations were scheduled to move to DFW.

In late 2014, Ameriflight reached agreement to acquire Wiggins Airways (48 aircraft and 100 employees), which would result in Ameriflight becoming the largest regional air cargo carrier in the world with 163 aircraft in its fleet.

Flight services

The majority of Ameriflight's operations consists of air feeder service for major package express integrators such as UPS, FedEx, and DHL. Its other significant customers include Lantheus Medical Imaging, ACS Products, and Mallinckrodt Pharmaceuticals. On schedules set by the customers, cargo is received in the early morning from large jet freighters at hub airports and distributed by Ameriflight airplanes to smaller communities whose traffic (or airports) would not support the big airplanes. In the evening, the Ameriflight aircraft fly back to the hubs to feed them with cargo from the smaller communities, which is carried onwards to the integrators' distribution centers for sorting and redistribution to the ultimate destinations.

Although demand is decreasing as use of digital imaging and electronic data transfer increases, Ameriflight also transports high-priority intercity financial documents. Pharmaceuticals, film for development, medical laboratory samples, and other miscellaneous cargo are also carried.

Ameriflight is one of the few Part 135 cargo carriers in the U.S. with a special Department of Transportation permit to carry high Transport Index radioactive cargo, an important element in the company's time-critical radioactive medical raw materials business, which transports radioactive "generator" materials between points of manufacture and cities where it is used to produce materials used in diagnostics and cancer therapy.

In addition to scheduled flying (with contract schedules set by customers), all Ameriflight bases can respond to unscheduled on-demand cargo flights to destinations in Alaska, Canada, the contiguous US, Mexico, the Caribbean, and South America. A single King Air 200 was used for on-demand passenger charter flights, but has since been retired.

Fleet

Current

The Ameriflight fleet includes these aircraft:

Former fleet

Accidents and incidents

References

External links

 Official website

Airlines based in Texas
Cargo airlines of the United States
Airlines established in 1968
1968 establishments in Texas